Umarkhed is a Municipal council in Yavatmal district of Indian State of Maharashtra.

Geography

It has an average elevation of 416 metres (1364 feet).

Umarkhed is a municipal town near the Painganga river. It is tehsil place. It is situated 110 km from Yavatmal and 72 km from Nanded. Umarkhed falls in Yavatmal district. It is surrounded by mountains and Ghats from three sides and a plane surface on one of its sides. During the monsoon, one can experience real treasure of nature.Ambona lake a tourist destination, is situated near the small town Churmura which is 3.6 km from Umarkhed city. The lake provides a beautiful boating site and a place to see sunsets and sunrises. Sahasrakund Waterfall in Painganga River near Jewali village is 50 km away from Umarkhed. Visitors come here in August, September, and October.

The town experiences both hotter summers and colder winters. The temperature rises up to 45 degrees Celsius in the summer, while in the winter it experiences temperatures of 8 to 12 degrees Celsius.

Painganga Wildlife Sanctuary is located in Umarkhed Tehsil of Yavatmal district of the Indian state Maharashtra. It derives its name from the river Painganga or Penganaga River which borders the sanctuary on its three sides. It encompasses a sprawling area of about 325 square kilometres and hosts a vast variety of flora and fauna. The sanctuary has been divided in the central region by a wide valley which forms the border of Nanded and Yavatmal districts.
The flora of the Painganga Wildlife Sanctuary features an exquisite combination of southern mixed deciduous forests and dry teak forests. The numerous species of fauna sheltered here include Fox, Leopard, Jackal, Hare, Four Horned Antelope, Porcupine, Sambar, Nilgai, Black Buck, Chinkara and many others. It is also a paradise for bird watchers to view Vulture, Bulbuls, Doves, Kingfishers, Cuckoos, Kites, and other birds. The best time to visit Painganga Wildlife Sanctuary is from the months of January to June. Jungle safari is an enjoyable experience in Painganga Wildlife Sanctuary.

Near Umarkhed there is the temple Balaji Mandir which is archeologically important and located in near the village Dhanora(Sa). The Lord balaji statue is 600 years old. The people of the  village celebrate their functions like marriage, Mahaprasad etc. in Balaji Mandir. Also near Umarkhed is the temple of Shri Kshetra Panchmukhi Mahadev Mandir, Hardada situated.

Demographics
 India census, Umarkhed had a population of 75000+ . Males constitute 51.13% of the population and females 48.87%. Umarkhed has an average literacy rate of 76.16%, higher than the national average of 61.5%: male literacy is 80.19%, and female literacy is 71.94%. In Umarkhed, 13.71% of the population is under 6 years of age.

Its population in 1961 was 12,647.

See also
 Painganga Wildlife Sanctuary
 Ambona lake
 Sahasrakund Waterfall

References

Cities and towns in Yavatmal district
Talukas in Maharashtra